The Battle of Lovejoy's Station was fought on August 20, 1864, near what is now Lovejoy, Georgia, in Clayton County, during the Atlanta Campaign of the American Civil War. The two sides had arrived at something of a stalemate, with the Union army half-encircling Atlanta and the Confederate defenders staying behind their fortifications.

The battle

While Confederate Cavalry commander Maj. Gen. Joseph Wheeler was absent, raiding Union supply lines from North Georgia to East Tennessee, Union Army commander Major General William T. Sherman sent cavalry Brigadier General Judson Kilpatrick to raid Confederate supply lines. Leaving on August 18, Kilpatrick hit the Atlanta & West Point Railroad that evening and disabled a small area of the track. Next, he proceeded for Lovejoy's Station on the Macon & Western Railroad. In transit, on August 19, Kilpatrick's men attacked the Jonesborough supply depot on the Macon & Western Railroad, burning great amounts of supplies. On August 20, they reached Lovejoy's Station and began their destruction. Confederate Infantry Dan Reynolds's Arkansas Brigade appeared and the raiders were forced to fight into the night, finally fleeing to prevent being surrounded. Although Kilpatrick had destroyed supplies and track at Lovejoy's Station, the railroad line was back in operation in two days.

Other Lovejoy's Station actions
The National Park Service considers the August 20 action to be a battle, but there were three other military actions at Lovejoy in 1864: Brig. Gen. Edward M. McCook's cavalry raid of July 29 and July 30,the September 2 to September 6 action, and the November 16 cavalry action. Historical archeology in 2010 documented unexplored portions of the battlefield that existed along McDonough-Jonesboro Road, east of U.S. Highway 41.

The Battlefield Today
The area of this historic battle has mostly been lost due to suburban sprawl of Clayton and Henry Counties, Georgia. The last  on the Henry County side are the site of a battle of another kind. Local citizens, preservationists, and historians are fighting to stop the development of this rural farmland. The local community has offered to buy back the land to develop a historic park to commemorate the Civil War battle.

Henry County, Georgia announced the official opening of the Nash Farm Battlefield Park, which was the scene of Kilpatrick's Raid on August 20 and the Infantry action from September 2 to September 6, 1864. Plans for the  battlefield include converting the farmhouse into a museum and renovating the barn into a public meetings and event facility, as well as walking trails throughout the property.  The museum, called the Nash Farm Battlefield Museum, was closed permanently on June 1, 2017 Due to a change in demographics among the county representatives. 

A survey, "Summary Report of History and Archeology of the Nash Farm Battlefield", was completed in August 2007. On March 12, 2008, Lovejoy Station was placed for the second time on the Civil War Preservation Trust's List of Most Endangered Civil War Battlefields. In 2010, the National Park Service published a revised assessment of the Civil War battles in Georgia, in which the Battle of Lovejoy was reassessed in terms of its military significance and its geographic extent (ABPP)

Contemporary sources (such as Four Years in the Saddle, by William Leontes Curry), state that fighting on August 20 was continuous from Lovejoy to Walnut Creek.

See also

 Atlanta in the Civil War

References
National Park Service battle description
 Phisterer, Frederick, Statistical Record of the Armies of the United States, Castle Books, 1883, .
 Elliott, Daniel T., and Tracy M. Dean, Nash Farm Battlefield: History and Archaeology, LAMAR Institute Publication Series, Report 123. The LAMAR Institute, Savannah, Georgia, 2007.
 Curry, William Leontes, Four Years in the Saddle : History of the First Regiment, Ohio Volunteer Cavalry. War of the Rebellion, 1861-1865, published by Freedom Hill Press, 1898.
 United States, Department of the Interior, National Park Service, American Battlefield Protection Program [ABPP] 	2010 Update to the Civil War Sites Advisory Commission Report on the Nation's Civil War Battlefields: State of Georgia. United States Department of the Interior, National Park Service, American Battlefield Protection Program. Washington, D.C. The American Battlefield Protection Program, (ABPP) is the highest entity in the United States that can recognize a battlefield. In 2010, the (ABPP) conducted a two month survey in Clayton & Henry County covering the Battle of Lovejoy's Station. Their final report included many changes from their first initial report that was written in 1993. The 2010 updated battlefield map called the (Core & Study Area) included all the land in Clayton & Henry County. The "Core areas" circled in red, the approach and exit and the entire battlefield circled in black. The area (highlighted in yellow) is eligible to be placed on the National Registry. www.nps.gov/abpp/CWSII/CWSIIStateReportGA.htm 
 Dr. David Evans, Author of "Sherman's Horsemen." Evans book is the authority of the cavalry action at the Battle of Lovejoy's Station. Dr. Evans primary sources are available in the back of his book.
 Southern Claims Commission - The (SCC), created by the government in 1871, was an organization which Southerners could file claims for reimbursement of personal property losses dues to the Civil War.  Thompson E. Nash, (owner of Nash Farm) filed for damages that occurred during Kilpatrick's Raid on August 20, 1864 during the Battle of Lovejoy's Station.
 Georgia D.O.T. Archaeological Survey of the "Jonesboro Road Widening Project" was conducted by Heather Mustone and her team, which included, Southeastern Archaeological Services spearheaded by Tom Gresham and the Georgia Historical Artifacts & Research Group. It was the largest archaeological survey conducted in Georgia D.O.T.'s history.

Notes

External links
Henry County fundraising
History of Nash Farm and the battles
Animated History of the Battle of Lovejoy's Station"

Lovejoy's Station
Lovejoy's Station
Lovejoy's Station
Lovejoy's Station
Clayton County, Georgia
Lovejoy's Station
1864 in Georgia (U.S. state)
August 1864 events
Lovejoy's Station